Front rouge ('Red Front') was a communist semi-monthly newspaper published from Villejuif, France, published 1933–1939. Paul Vaillant-Couturier was the editor-in-chief of the newspaper. In 1935 it had a circulation of 4,700, by 1937 the circulation had reached 6,000.

Front rouge was published irregularly as an underground publication during the Second World War.

References

1933 establishments in France
1939 disestablishments in France
Semi-monthly newspapers
French-language communist newspapers
Defunct newspapers published in France
History of the French Communist Party
Newspapers published in Paris
Publications established in 1933
Publications disestablished in 1939